Soběšice is a municipality and village in Klatovy District in the Plzeň Region of the Czech Republic. It has about 400 inhabitants.

Administrative parts
Villages of Damíč and Mačice are administrative parts of Soběšice.

References

Villages in Klatovy District